The 30th Anniversary Collection is a triple CD collection released in 2008, celebrating the 30th anniversary of Whitesnake. It was released by EMI and charted at number 38 on the UK Albums Chart.

Background
In 2003 the compilation album The Silver Anniversary Collection was released featuring two CDs to celebrate the band's 25th Anniversary, but this compilation celebrating the band's 30th Anniversary features as a box set compilation consisting of three CDs. Disc one is essentially the same as the compilation The Early Years, and disc two and three are "updated" versions of the two-disc compilation The Silver Anniversary Collection.

Track listing

Charts

Notes

Whitesnake compilation albums
2008 compilation albums
EMI Records compilation albums